Hataraliyadda is a village in Sri Lanka. It is located within Central Province in Kandy district. Hataraliyadda is about 10 km from Galagedara on Kandy Kurunegala road. Proposed interchange of expressway of Naranwala is located on Rambukkana Galagedara road.

See also
List of towns in Central Province, Sri Lanka

External links

Populated places in Kandy District